Schoenmaker and Schoenmakers are Dutch occupational surnames meaning "shoemaker". People with these names include:

Lex Schoenmaker (born 1947), Dutch football player and manager
Michael Schoenmaker (born 1983), Dutch Paralympic swimmer
Milo Schoenmaker (born 1967), Dutch politician (VVD)
Neville Schoenmaker, Australian botanist and cannabis breeder
Piet Schoenmakers (1919–2009), Dutch abstract artist
Ryan Schoenmakers (born 1990), Australian rules footballer 
Tatjana Schoenmaker (born 1997), South African swimmer

The name can also refer to:
5071 Schoenmaker, an asteroid

Occupational surnames
Dutch-language surnames